Dominick Sullivan (born 1 April 1951 in Glasgow), is a Scottish former football midfielder.

Playing career
Sullivan began his career with Clyde, making 176 league appearances in 6 years before moving to Aberdeen. He moved to Celtic in 1979 and had spells with Greenock Morton and Alloa Athletic before retiring.

Management career

Dom Sullivan was appointed as player-manager of Alloa Athletic in the 1986–87 season. After retiring as a player, he later managed East Stirlingshire in the early 1990s. Whilst a coach at Falkirk Dom was twice made caretaker manager in between the spells of Jim Duffy and Billy Lamont, then Billy Lamont and Jim Jefferies.

Post-football career
He now owns the Railway Hotel pub in Denny.

Honours 
 Clyde
 Scottish Division Two: 1972–73

 Aberdeen
 Scottish Premier Division:  Runner-up 1977–78
 Scottish League Cup: 1976–77
 Scottish Cup: Runner-up 1977–78

 Celtic
 Scottish Premier Division: 1980–81, 1981–82
 Runner-up: 1979–80, 1982–83

 Morton
 Scottish First Division: 1983–84
 Renfrewshire Cup: Runner-up 1983–84

References

External links

Living people
Footballers from Glasgow
1951 births
Scottish footballers
Clyde F.C. players
Aberdeen F.C. players
Celtic F.C. players
Greenock Morton F.C. players
Alloa Athletic F.C. players
Scottish football managers
Alloa Athletic F.C. managers
Falkirk F.C. managers
East Stirlingshire F.C. managers
Scottish Football League players
Scotland under-23 international footballers
Scottish Football League managers
Association football midfielders